Eidus is a surname. Notable people with the surname include:

 Khaim Eidus (1896–1972), Soviet politician, orientalist, and japanologist
 Arnold Eidus (1922–2013), American classical violinist
 Roza Eidus (1930–2018), Russian classical pianist
 Janice Eidus (born 1951), American writer